Alcides is a genus of uraniid moths from northern Australia, New Guinea, and other islands in the region. They are diurnal and strongly marked with iridescent colours.

List of species

 Alcides agathyrsus Kirsch, 1877 [syn.= A. boops (Westwood, 1879)]
 Alcides aruus Felder, 1874
 Alcides aurora Salvin & Godman, 1877
 Alcides cydnus Felder, 1859
 Alcides latona Druce, 1886
 Alcides leone Vinciguerra, 2007
 Alcides metaurus Hopffer, 1856 [syn.=A. zodiaca (Butler, 1869)]
 Alcides orontes Linnaeus, 1763
 Alcides privitera Vinciguerra, 2007

Current systematic and taxonomic knowledge of Genus Alcides is incomplete, so
the status of some taxa remains uncertain including for example, 
 Alcides argyrios Gmelin, 1788
 Alcides arnus Felder & Rogenhofer, 1874 (Probably misprint for aruus)
 Alcides coerulea Pfeiff., 1925
 Alcides latona Druce, 1886 [vide supra] vs. Alcides ribbei [vide infra] 
 Alcides liris Felder, 1860
 Alcides pallida Pfeiff., 1925
 Alcides passavanti Pfeiff., 1925
 Alcides ribbei Pagenstecher, 1912  (Perhaps junior synonym of Alcides latona?)
 Alcides sordidior Rothschild, 1916

References 

 Biolib
 Vinciguerra, Roberto. Osservatione sul Genere Alcides Hübner (1822) e descrizione di due nuove specie dell’Indonesia (Lepidoptera, Uraniidae). Fragmenta entomologica, Roma, 39 (2): 299-309 (2007). DOI:doi.org/10.4081/fe.2007.126 (accessed Sep 10,2019)

Uraniidae